Spotless may refer to:
 Spotless (Australian business), an Australian integrated services company providing cleaning, catering, laundry services, facilities management
 Spotless Group, pan-European manufacturer of insect control and laundry products
 Spotless (TV series), a Franco - British television series